Leo Sulky (6 December 1874 – 3 June 1957) was an American actor. He usually appeared in films directed by Del Lord such as Black Oxfords (1924), Yukon Jake (1924), Wall Street Blues (1924), Lizzies of the Field (1924), Galloping Bungalows (1924), From Rags to Britches (1925), and A Sea Dog's Tale (1926); by Harry Edwards such as The Lion and the Souse (1924), The Luck o' the Foolish (1924). The Hansom Cabman (1924), All Night Long (1924), There He Goes (1925), The Sea Squawk (1925), Boobs in the Wood (1925), and Plain Clothes (1925); and by Ralph Ceder such as Little Robinson Corkscrew (1924),  and Wandering Waistlines (1924).

He also appeared in The First 100 Years (1924) by Harry Sweet, The Window Dummy (1925) by Lloyd Bacon, Hotsy Totsy (1925) by Alf Goulding, Alice Be Good (1926) by Eddie Cline, Picking Peaches (1924) by Erle C. Kenton, Romeo and Juliet (1924), She Couldn't Say No (1954), Reap the Wild Wind (1942), The Rainmakers (1935), The Jolly Jilter (1927) starring Lois Boyd and Bud Ross, The Wild Goose Chaser (1925) and A Raspberry Romance (1925).

Selected filmography

 The Village Smithy (1919, Short) as Minor Role (uncredited)
 Ten Dollars or Ten Days (1920, Short)
 A Wooden Legacy (1920, Short)
 Her Lucky Day (1920, Short)
 Cinderella Cinders (1920, Short)
 Lunatics in Politics (1920, Short)
 The Tomboy (1921) as The Ex-Bartender
 Big Town Ideas (1921) as George Small
 Ten Dollars or Ten Days (1924, Short) as The Police Captain
 Picking Peaches (1924, Short) as Fashion Show Judge (uncredited)
 One Spooky Night (1924, Short) as Hobo (uncredited)
 Scarem Much (1924, Short) as Ringside Spectator (uncredited)
 Flickering Youth (1924, Short) as Minor Role (uncredited)
 Black Oxfords (1924, Short) as Prison Sheriff Umpire
 Yukon Jake (1924, Short) as Jake's Henchman (uncredited)
 The Lion and the Souse (1924, Short) as Charley Elk - Actor
 Romeo and Juliet (1924, Short) as Drinking Theatregoer (uncredited)
 Wall Street Blues (1924, Short) as Money Loaner / Police Captain
 The First 100 Years (1924, Short) as Hypnotist (uncredited)
 Lizzies of the Field (1924, Short) as Race Official (uncredited)
 The Luck o' the Foolish (1924, Short) as Train Passenger
 Little Robinson Corkscrew (1924, Short) as Villager
 Wandering Waistlines (1924, Short) as Minor Role (uncredited)
 The Hansom Cabman (1924, Short) as A Butler
 Galloping Bungalows (1924, Short) as Fireman (uncredited)
 All Night Long (1924, Short) as Bank Robber (uncredited)
 The Cannon Ball Express (1924, Short) as Engineer
 Feet of Mud (1924, Short) as Chinatown Huckster (uncredited)
 Off His Trolley (1924, Short) as Trolley Conductor (uncredited)
 Bull and Sand (1924, Short) as Officer in Box (uncredited)
 The Sea Squawk (1925, Short) as Detective
 The Wild Goose Chaser (1925, Short) as Butler / Lover in Film
 Boobs in the Wood (1925, Short) as ToughMike / Poker Dealer
 Water Wagons (1925, Short) as Dangerfield's Henchman
 The Raspberry Romance (1925, Short) as Leo Mallet - Seymour's Partner
 Plain Clothes (1925, Short) as The Pawnbroker
 Breaking the Ice (1925, Short) as The Hotel Detective
 Super-Hooper-Dyne Lizzies (1925, Short) as 1st Prospective Buyer
 Sneezing Beezers (1925, Short) as The New King
 The Iron Nag (1925, Short) as Waldo Watkins
 Butter Fingers (1925, Short) as Umpire / Baseball Player (uncredited)
 A Rainy Knight (1925, Short) as Brock's Business Associate
 Good Morning, Madam! (1925, Short) as The Restaurant Owner
 A Sweet Pickle (1925, Short) as Guest
 Take Your Time (1925, Short) as The Burglar
 There He Goes (1925, Short) as The Butler
 The Window Dummy (1925, Short) as The Store Manager
 From Rags to Britches (1925, Short) as Attorney John Lawler
 Hotsy-Totsy (1925) as Store Detective (uncredited)
 Wide Open Faces (1926, Short) as Townsman in Barroom
 Muscle-Bound Music (1926, Short) as The Ring Announcer
 A Yankee Doodle Duke (1926, Short) as Servant (uncredited)
 Ice Cold Cocos (1926, Short) as Mr. Thaw
 A Sea Dog's Tale (1926, Short) as Native (uncredited)
 Alice Be Good (1926, Short) as Minor Role
 Smith's Vacation (1926, Short) as Baggage Car Man / 1st Tour Guide
 Hoboken to Hollywood (1926, Short) as Company President
 Strictly Kosher (1926, Short) as Pat O'Conner
 Smith's Landlord (1926, Short) as Large Mover
 Love's Last Laugh (1926, Short) as Ship's Officer (uncredited)
 Smith's Visitor (1926, Short) as Jimmy's Pal
 Masked Mamas (1926, Short) as The Practical Joker
 A Harem Knight (1926, Short) as Man with Whisk Broom (uncredited)
 Kitty from Killarney (1926, Short) as Theatre Manager
 Should Sleepwalkers Marry? (1927, Short) as Churchgoer (uncredited)
 The Plumber's Daughter (1927, Short) as Servant
 The Jolly Jilter (1927, Short) as Groomer (uncredited)
 A Small Town Princess (1927, Short) as Waiter (uncredited)
 Smith's Kindergarten (1927, Short) as The Grocer
 Love 'Em and Weep (1927, Short) as Restaurant Manager (uncredited)
 Ham and Herring (1927, Short) as Pat O'Connor
 Fiddlesticks (1927, Short) as Pawnbroker (uncredited)
 Have a Heart (1928, Short) as Mad Scientist's Assistant (uncredited)
 Habeas Corpus (1928, Short) as Detective On Telephone (uncredited)
 Going Ga-Ga (1929, Short) as Minor Role (uncredited)
 Movie Night (1929, Short) as Movie Patron (uncredited)
 The Hoose-Gow (1929, Short) as Prison Guard (uncredited)
 Numbered Men (1930) as Convict (uncredited)
 Sweethearts on Parade (1930)
 Beau Hunks (1932, Short) as Legionnaire / Arab Soldier (uncredited)
 Tiger Shark (1932) as Drinking Crewman (uncredited)
 A Wrestler's Bride (1933, Short) as Man Behind Desk (uncredited)
 Thundering Taxis (1933, Short) as Blocker Cabbie (uncredited)
 The Power and the Glory (1933) as 2nd Strike Leader on Platform (uncredited)
 Duck Soup (1933) as Agitator (uncredited)
 Blood Money (1933) as Detective (uncredited)
 The Son of Kong (1933) as Minor Role (uncredited)
 Les Misérables (1935) as Galley Whip Warder (uncredited)
 Party Wire (1935) as Townsman at Meeting (uncredited)
 The Rainmakers (1935) as Fireman (uncredited)
 A Night at the Opera (1935) as Policeman (uncredited)
 The Calling of Dan Matthews (1935) as Bartender (uncredited)
 Sons o' Guns (1936) as Soldier (uncredited)
 Our Relations (1936) as Courtroom Spectator (uncredited)
 We Who Are About to Die (1937) as Convict (uncredited)
 Marked Woman (1937) as Bartender (uncredited)
 San Quentin (1937) as Convict (uncredited)
 Destry Rides Again (1939) as Bartender (uncredited)
 Reap the Wild Wind (1942) as Juror (uncredited)
 Larceny, Inc. (1942) as Passerby (uncredited)
 Action in the North Atlantic (1943) as Unemployed Seaman (uncredited)
 The Good Fellows (1943) as Townsman (uncredited)
 The Saxon Charm (1948) as Cafe Waiter (uncredited)
 Not Wanted (1949) as Townsman (uncredited)
 Reign of Terror (1949) as Citizen (uncredited)
 Always Leave Them Laughing (1949) as New Haven Electrician (uncredited)
 Kill the Umpire (1950) as Minor Role (uncredited)
 Harvey (1950) as Minor Role (uncredited)
 Belle Le Grand (1951) as Miner at Lynching (uncredited)
 Meet Danny Wilson (1952) as Minor Role (uncredited)
 Stars and Stripes Forever (1952) as Spectator (uncredited)
 She Couldn't Say No (1953) as Minor Role (uncredited) (final film role)

References

Bibliography

External links
 
 

1874 births
1957 deaths
Male actors from Cincinnati
20th-century American male actors
American male silent film actors